François Garcia (25 September 1917 – 15 November 2004) was a French racing cyclist. He rode in the 1939 Tour de France.

References

1917 births
2004 deaths
French male cyclists
Place of birth missing